Armin Dahlen (14 October 1919 – 26 July 2013) was an Austrian actor. He also directed for television. He starred in the 1954 Ealing Studios drama The Divided Heart. He died in July 2013 at the age of 93.

Selected filmography

 White Gold (1949) - Konrad, deren Sohn
 The Cloister of Martins (1951) - Rimiger
 The White Adventure (1952) - Skilehrer Fasser (uncredited)
 Heimat Bells (1952) - Mathias Brucker
 Two People (1952) - Christian
 Roses Bloom on the Moorland (1952) - Ludwig Amelung, Architekt
 Young Heart Full of Love (1953) - Junglehrer Gstreiner
 Das Kreuz am Jägersteig (1954) - Andreas
 The Divided Heart (1954) - Franz
 The Phantom of the Big Tent (1954) - Lal Singh, Mann mit dem Elefanten
  (1955) - Infanterie-Major
 You Can No Longer Remain Silent (1955) - Bjarne Lon
 Das Erbe vom Pruggerhof (1956) - Georg Marquardt, Bildhauer
 The Golden Bridge (1956) - Hellborg
 Where the Ancient Forests Rustle (1956) - Toni Burgstaller
 Der Schandfleck (1956) - Der Almhofbauer
 War of the Maidens (1957) - Gustav Kugler, Frächter
 Der Pfarrer von St. Michael (1957) - Georg Santner
  (1957) - Ludwig Angerer
 The Green Devils of Monte Cassino (1958) - Pater Emmanuel
 Blitzmädels an die Front (1958) - Hauptmann
 Worüber man nicht spricht - Frauenarzt Dr. Brand greift ein (1958) - Priester
 Stalingrad: Dogs, Do You Want to Live Forever? (1959) - Major Stanescu
 Die zornigen jungen Männer (1960) - Karlebach
 Der Transport (1961) - Feldwebel Steinlein
 Mörderspiel (1961) - Kriminalassistent #1
 The Longest Day (1962) - Blumentritt's Adjutant (uncredited)
 Als ich noch der Waldbauernbub war... (1963, TV film) - Lorenz Rosegger
 Aus meiner Waldheimat (1963, TV film) - Lorenz Rosegger
 Als ich beim Käthele im Wald war (1963, TV film) - Lorenz Rosegger
 Der Chef wünscht keine Zeugen (1964)
  (1968–1969, TV series) - Fra Donato

References

Bibliography 
 Fritsche, Maria. Homemade Men in Postwar Austrian Cinema: Nationhood, Genre and Masculinity. Berghahn Books, 2013.

External links 
 

1919 births
2013 deaths
20th-century Austrian male actors
Austrian male film actors
Austrian male television actors